Brenta Valley is a valley located in Northern Italy.

References

See also
Brenta (river)
Brenta Group
Valsugana

Valleys of Italy
Valleys of Trentino-Alto Adige/Südtirol